Qoyunbinəsi (also, Koyunbinasi) is a village and municipality in the Yevlakh Rayon of Azerbaijan.  It has a population of 2,695.

References 

Populated places in Yevlakh District